Caprice Willard is the Vice President and Regional Planning Manager for the Southwest region of Macy's women's apparel. Willard is a buyer representing Macy's on NBC's Fashion Star, seasons 1 and 2.

References

Year of birth missing (living people)
Living people
American business executives
Corporate executives